Chlopsis is a genus of eels of the family Chlopsidae.

Species
There are currently 12 recognized species in this genus:
 Chlopsis apterus (Beebe & Tee-Van, 1938) (Stripe-snout false moray)
 Chlopsis bicollaris (G. S. Myers & Wade, 1941) (Bicolor false moray)
 Chlopsis bicolor Rafinesque, 1810 (Bicolor eel)
 Chlopsis bidentatus Tighe & J. E. McCosker, 2003
 Chlopsis dentatus (Seale, 1917) (Mottled false moray)
 Chlopsis kazuko Lavenberg, 1988 (Mexican false moray)
 Chlopsis longidens (Garman, 1899)
 Chlopsis nanhaiensis Tighe, H. C. Ho, Pogonoski & Hibino, 2015 
 Chlopsis olokun (C. R. Robins & C. H. Robins, 1966)
 Chlopsis orientalis Tighe, Hibino & Q. V. Nguyễn, 2015 
 Chlopsis sagmacollaris Pogonoski & Tighe, 2015 
 Chlopsis slusserorum Tighe & J. E. McCosker, 2003

References

Eels
Chlopsidae
Taxa named by Constantine Samuel Rafinesque
Marine fish genera